Alabama state elections in 2020 were held on Tuesday, November 3, 2020. Its primary elections were held on March 3, 2020, with runoffs taking place on July 31.

In addition to the U.S. presidential race, Alabama voters will elect the class II U.S. Senator from Alabama, 4 of 9 members of the Alabama State Board of Education, all of its seats to the House of Representatives, 2 of 9 seats on the Supreme Court of Alabama, 4 of 10 seats on the Alabama Appellate Court and one seat of the Alabama House of Representatives. It will also vote on five ballot measures.

To vote by mail, registered Alabama voters must request a ballot by October 29, 2020. As of early October some 130,576 voters have requested mail ballots.

Federal offices

President of the United States

Alabama has 9 electoral votes in the Electoral College. Donald Trump won all of them with 62% of the popular vote.

United States class II Senate seat

Republican Tommy Tuberville defeated incumbent Democrat Doug Jones, winning 60% of the vote.

United States House of Representatives

There were five U.S. Representatives in Alabama that were up for election in addition to two open seats. 6 seats were won by the Republicans while 1 seat was won by the Democrats. No congressional districts changed hands.

Public Service Commission

President

Democratic primary

Republican primary

General election

State Board of Education
4 of 9 seats of the Alabama State Board of Education are up for election (one is a non-elected position held by the Governor). Before the election the composition of that board was:

Member, District 1

Candidates
Both Democratic & Republican are cancelled respectively.
Tom Holmes (Democratic)
Jackie Zeigler, incumbent (Republican)

General election

Member, District 3

Candidates
Both Democratic & Republican are cancelled respectively.
Jarralynne Agee (Democratic)
Stephanie Bell, incumbent (Republican)

General election

Member, District 5

Republican primary
Lesa Keith

Democratic primary

General election

Member, District 7

General election

State judiciary
The state Supreme Court has 9 seats, all of which are currently occupied by Republican incumbents. At the appellate level, 2 of 5 seats on Alabama Court of Civil Appeals and 2 of 5 on the Alabama Court of Criminal Appeals are up for election. All seats on both courts are currently held by the Republican Party.

State Supreme Court, place one

Democratic primary
No candidates filed for election to this seat.

Republican primary

Nominee
Greg Shaw, incumbent

Eliminated in primary
Cam Ward, state senator

Polling

Results

State House of Representatives
A special election had been called for November 17, 2020, for District 49 as a result of Republican incumbent April Weaver resigning from the legislature. Primaries were held on August 4 that year, with a Republican runoff set for September 1.

Ballot measures

Amendment 1 (March)
In addition to the five amendments that are being voted on in November, Amendment 1 – called the Appointed Education Board Amendment – was defeated in the state's primary. It would have replaced the elected State Board of Education with a Commission on Elementary and Secondary Education whose members would have been appointed by the Governor with the approval of the state senate.

Polling

Results

Amendment 1 (November)

Amendment 2

Amendment 3

Amendment 4

Amendment 5

Amendment 6

Notes

Partisan clients

References

External links
 
 
  (State affiliate of the U.S. League of Women Voters)
 
 . ("Deadlines, dates, requirements, registration options and information on how to vote in your state")
 

 
Alabama
Alabama elections by year